Christopher Paul Bryan  (b 1975) has been Archdeacon of Malmesbury since 2019.

Bryan was educated at RGS High Wycombe, University College, Oxford and was ordained in 2001. After a curacy in Old Swinford he was priest in charge of St Lawrence, Lechlade. He has also held posts in Fairford, Hullavington and Stanton St Quintin.  He was Area Dean of North Wiltshire before his appointment as Archdeacon.

References

1975 births
Living people
Alumni of University College, Oxford
21st-century English Anglican priests
Archdeacons of Malmesbury